Joe Palooka in Fighting Mad is a 1948 American comedy film directed by Reginald Le Borg and starring Leon Errol, Joe Kirkwood, Jr. and Elyse Knox. It was part of the Joe Palooka series, produced and distributed by Monogram Pictures.

Plot
Blinded during a fight, Joe Palooka is advised to take at least a year off from boxing. His manager Knobby Walsh finds another fighter, but when gangsters cause him trouble, Joe volunteers to climb back into the ring, against his doctor's advice.

Cast
 Joe Kirkwood Jr. as Joe Palooka
 Leon Errol as Knobby
 Elyse Knox as Anne
 Patricia Dane as Iris March
 John Hubbard as Charles Kennedy
 Wally Vernon as Archie Stone
 Horace McMahon as Truck Driver
 Eddie Gribbon as Scranton
 Sarah Padden as Mom Palooka
 Herb Vigran as Reporter
 Dewey Robinson as Fighter
 Emil Sitka as Photographer
 Cy Kendall as Commissioner R.E. Carfter
 Frank Mayo as Detective (uncredited)

References

Bibliography
 Drew, Bernard A. Motion Picture Series and Sequels: A Reference Guide. Routledge, 2013.

External links
Joe Palooka in Fighting Mad at TCM
 

1948 films
1940s sports films
American black-and-white films
American boxing films
Films directed by Reginald Le Borg
Monogram Pictures films
Films based on American comics
1940s American films
Joe Palooka films